Vikedal is a former municipality in Rogaland county, Norway. The  municipality existed from 1838 until its dissolution in 1965. It was located along the Vindafjorden and Sandeidfjorden in the northern part of the Ryfylke district. The administrative centre of the municipality was the village of Vikedal, where Vikedal Church is located.

History
The parish of Vikedal was created as a municipality on 1 January 1838 (see formannskapsdistrikt law). On 1 January 1923, the  municipality was divided in three. The northwestern part became the  municipality of Sandeid (population: 558), the central part remained as the  municipality of Vikedal (population: 924), and the southeastern part became the  municipality of Imsland (population: 604).

On 1 January 1965, a major municipal reform took place resulting from the recommendations of the Schei Committee. The municipality of Vikedal was dissolved on that date and it was split up among two municipalities.  The Hapnes and Dokskar farms (population: 2) were merged into the neighboring municipality of Tysvær to the southwest. The rest of Vikedal (population: 978) was merged with the municipality of Sandeid and parts of the municipalities of Imsland, Vats and Skjold to form the new municipality called Vindafjord.

Government
All municipalities in Norway, including Vikedal, are responsible for primary education (through 10th grade), outpatient health services, senior citizen services, unemployment and other social services, zoning, economic development, and municipal roads.  The municipality is governed by a municipal council of elected representatives, which in turn elects a mayor.

Municipal council
The municipal council  of Vikedal was made up of 17 representatives that were elected to four year terms.  The party breakdown of the final municipal council was as follows:

See also
List of former municipalities of Norway

References

Vindafjord
Tysvær
Former municipalities of Norway
1838 establishments in Norway
1965 disestablishments in Norway